Olaf Dreßel (born 19 September 1968) is a retired German football defender.

References

External links
 

1968 births
Living people
Sportspeople from Bochum
German footballers
Bundesliga players
2. Bundesliga players
VfL Bochum II players
VfL Bochum players
SpVgg Erkenschwick players
Association football defenders
Footballers from North Rhine-Westphalia